The 1872 United States presidential election in Maine took place on November 5, 1872. All contemporary 37 states were part of the 1872 United States presidential election. The state voters chose seven electors to the Electoral College, which selected the president and vice president.

Maine was won by the Republican nominees, incumbent President Ulysses S. Grant of Illinois and his running mate Senator Henry Wilson of Massachusetts. Grant and Wilson defeated the Liberal Republican and Democratic nominees, former Congressman Horace Greeley of New York and his running mate former Senator and Governor Benjamin Gratz Brown of Missouri by a margin of 35.72%.

Results

See also
 United States presidential elections in Maine

References

Maine
1872
1872 Maine elections